Oleksiy Khramtsov (born 8 November 1975, Simferopol, Ukrainian SSR, Soviet Union) is a professional Ukrainian football defender who played for different clubs in the Ukrainian Premier League. He is plays currently for the club of Navbahor Namangan in the Uzbek League as captain.

External links 
 Official Website Profile
 Official FFU Website Profile

1975 births
Living people
Sportspeople from Simferopol
Ukrainian footballers
MFC Mykolaiv players
FC Kryvbas-2 Kryvyi Rih players
FC Spartak Ivano-Frankivsk players
SC Tavriya Simferopol players
FC Stal Alchevsk players
Navbahor Namangan players
FC Zorya Luhansk players
FC Hvardiyets Hvardiiske players
FC Krymteplytsia Molodizhne players
Ukrainian expatriate footballers
Expatriate footballers in Uzbekistan
Crimean Premier League players
Association football defenders